Hemavati may refer to:

 Hemavati River, in Karnataka, India
 Hemavati (raga), a ragam (musical scale) in Carnatic music (South Indian classical music)
Shailaputri, in Hinduism